Björk Orkestral is an "unplugged" concert series by Icelandic musician Björk. Originally announced for the summer of 2020, all concert dates were delayed due to the COVID-19 pandemic. A four-part concert series was later announced for August 2020 at the Harpa concert hall in Reykjavik, then rescheduled to October and November 2021 due to new restrictions against the pandemic by the Icelandic government. Each date featured different musicians, instrumentation and set lists and all four concerts were live streamed to raise money for Kvennaathvarfið, a women's shelter in Reykjavik. Over 100 Icelandic musicians joined Björk on stage across the four matinee performances, which were some of the first live performances with an audience by a major international singer since COVID-19 crippled the live music industry.

Background and concept

After touring her "theatrical" stage production, Cornucopia, in 2019, Björk announced a new concert series called Björk Orkestral (originally spelled Björk Orchestral) in February 2020. The original dates were scheduled for summer 2020 in France, England, Russia, Finland and Germany, and the tour was billed as acoustic, strings-only shows in celebration of Björk's "orchestral arrangements of works so far". Shortly after these dates were announced, however, the coronavirus pandemic put a crippling halt on live concerts and Björk had to postpone the show until summer 2022.

Measures the Icelandic government took to contain the virus proved to be one of the most effective throughout the world, and by mid-May 2020 the country had slowed the spread of the coronavirus to 2 new cases a week, effectively eradicating COVID-19 from its shores.

Recognizing the unique position Iceland was in but also the devastating global economic impact COVID-19 left in its wake, along with the world-wide Black Lives Matter protests in response to the police murder of George Floyd in the United States, Björk decided it was the right time to bring her orchestral concerts to live audiences in her home country. "There are many musicians out of work right now... Many of them live by playing concerts because they no longer earn revenue from record sales." She credits her father's role in Iceland unions for her desire to fight for musician's wages. The proceeds from the concerts went to Kvennaathvarfið, a women's shelter dedicated to refugees in Iceland, though Björk revealed that due to the isolation experienced during lock down, Icelandic women in general are in need of Kvennaathvarfið's services. In addition to concert ticket sales, each matinee performances was followed by an evening of food and beverages with the proceeds also going to Kvennaathvarfið. In addition to the funds raised in Iceland, the concerts were live streamed throughout the world to raise money for charity with donations being sent to non-profit organizations in each country the shows are streamed in.

As for the concerts themselves, Björk has wanted to hold these acoustic-only shows since publishing her first collection of sheet music in 2017. 34 Scores for Piano, Organ, Harpsichord and Celeste features acoustic arrangements created in collaboration with her longtime accompanist Jónas Sen which covers her entire discography. Björk Orkestral saw Björk reunite with over 100 Icelandic musicians, Sen included, that have contributed to her studio albums and live concerts. Initially only 3 concerts were announced, but on 13 July 2020 a 4th show was added to the schedule. Each concert featured a different set of musicians and instruments and a unique set list.
The 11 October show featured the strings section of the Icelandic Symphony Orchestra, conducted by Viktor Orri Árnason, in addition to the harpist Katie Buckley. Árnason replaces Bjarni Frimann Bjarnason who was originally announced as conductor. The performance will draw the bulk of its material from Björk's albums, Post (1995) and Vespertine (2001) plus the 2000 soundtrack album Selmasongs.

The 24 October show featured the 50-person Hamrahlíð Choir conducted by Þorgerður Ingólfsdóttir and musician Bergur Þórisson on organ and will feature songs primarily from Björk's albums, Medúlla (2004), Biophilia (2011) and Utopia (2017). Both The Hamrahlíð Choir and Þórisson featured on the album Utopia and performed on the New York and EU dates of the Cornucopia tour.

The October 31 show featured the brass section of the Icelandic Symphony Orchestra in addition to the flute septet Viibra. The members of Viibra played the flutes on Björk's 2017 album Utopia and officially formed as a group to tour with Björk throughout the Utopia and Cornucopia tours. In addition to brass and flutes, the night will see American-born harpist Katie Buckley return in addition to pianist and long-time collaborator Jónas Sen. Material will be drawn from the albums Vespertine, Volta (2007) and Utopia.

These concerts were held in collaboration with Iceland Airwaves, RÚV, Harpa, Promote Iceland, and Icelandair.

Songs performed 
During each concert in Iceland, Björk performed a different set of songs to fit the different musicians invited to perform with her.

For the touring shows, Björk performs with a 22 piece string orchestra, combining songs from the 4 original Reykjavík shows. 

{{Hidden
| headercss = background: #DCDCDC; font-size: 100%; width: 100%;  
| contentcss = text-align: left; font-size: 100%; width: 100%; 
| header = Touring set list
| content =
This set list is representative of the show on 24 July 2022, in Cheshire.

 "Stonemilker"
 "Aurora"
 "Come to Me"
 "Lionsong"
 "I've Seen It All"
 "History of Touches"
 "Black Lake"
 "Hunter"
 "You've Been Flirting Again"
 "Isobel"
 "Bachelorette"
 "Jóga"
 "Quicksand"
 "Hyperballad"
 Encore
 "Overture"
 "Pluto"

 During the first show in Miami, "5 Years", "Mouth Mantra" and "Notget" were performed instead of "You've Been Flirting Again", "Hyperballad" and "Overture".
 After the release of Fossora, the songs "Ovule" and "Freefall" were added to the setlist on selected dates.
}}

Tour dates

Cancelled shows

Reschedulations
The tour has been marred by repeated shows' rescheduling due to the ongoing COVID-19 pandemic. 
The Icelandic dates have been forced to move a world record number of times, with the series at the Harpa first scheduled to commence on 9 August 2020, then 29 August 2020, then 17 January 2021, then 18 April 2021, then 29 August 2021, and finally 11 October 2021, a total of six different leg's dates.

References 

2021 concert tours
Björk concert tours
Concert tours postponed due to the COVID-19 pandemic
2022 concert tours
2023 concert tours